UFO: Target Earth (also known as Target Earth) is a 1974 American film directed by Michael A. DeGaetano.

Plot summary 
The film opens with "'eyewitness accounts' recounting incredible UFO sightings and abductions", according to sci-fi scholar Howard Hughes. The story follows an electronics expert (Alan Grimes) who picks up strange signals: he then finds the signals are coming from a rural section in his area, and tries to find out if this is the start of an invasion from space. He enlists the help of a psychic "sensitive" (Vivian), and two fellow university computer electronics experts (Dr. Mansfield and Dan Rivers), and together they trace the source to a location somewhere beneath the surface of a lake. The alien presence discloses itself to Alan as formless energy trapped there 1000 years by the fears of humans, which impose shapes on them. Alan is the source of the energy they need to return. All he has to do is set aside his fears and die. They tell him that in the whole history of the human race only three had ascended and now he will be the fourth to ascend. Alan rapidly ages, walks into the lake, fights off Dan's attempts to restrain him, and dies. Dan frantically pulls Alan's skeletal remains back onto the shore, the energy pattern departs into space, and the screen displays a quote from Revelations 5.9.

Cast 
Nick Plakias as Alan Grimes
Cynthia Cline as Vivian
LaVerne Light as Dr. Mansfield
Tom Arcuragi as Dan Rivers
Phil Erickson as Dr. Whitham
Brooks Clift as Gen. David Gallagher
Martha Corrigan as Woman on Veranda
Kathleen Long as Planetarium Receptionist
Billy Crane as Alan
Tom Harper as Interviewer
Ed Lynch as University Professor
Ida Agree as Housewife
Luann McMann as Farm Couple
George Lafia as Farm Couple
Johnny Baker as Rancher
Sam Durrance as Rancher

Locations
The film was shot in and around Atlanta, Georgia. Locations include Fernbank Science Center, Manuel's Tavern and Stone Mountain State Park.

Later releases 
The film was released on VHS on 12 June 1989. It is also available on the internet, and on DVD (in two different cuts).

Soundtrack 
The soundtrack featured electronic music plus the song "Between the Ceiling and the Sky" by the group Eclipse.

Reception
Howard Hughes commented that "the movie is so cheap as to be oddly unsettling".
Hughes remarks that the "plot makes no sense whatsoever".

See also
 List of American films of 1974

References

 Crowder, Jerry. "UFO: Target Earth and How It Was Filmed", American Cinematographer, volume 55#7 (July) 1974 pp 790+.

External links 

1974 films
1970s science fiction films
American science fiction films
1970s English-language films
1970s American films